Tony Maylam (born 1943) is a BAFTA-nominated English filmmaker, known for directing documentaries such as White Rock, the 1979 thriller The Riddle of the Sands,  and horror films such as The Burning and Split Second.

Life and career 
Trained at the Royal Academy of Dramatic Art, he began his career as an actor and then television presenter for ZDF Bermuda (The Tony Maylam Show) and the UK's ITV (Sportsweek), before concentrating solely on filmmaking. Always interested in sport, he began his cinematic career in 1972 with the film Cup Glory, a feature-length theatrical film with Richard Attenborough on the 100 years of the FA Cup.  A number of films for television followed, which he wrote and directed, including Graham, on Graham Hill with Paul Newman (which was one of the highest rated documentaries shown on British television in the 1970s) and A Fast Drive in the Country with James Coburn.  This led to White Rock, again featuring James Coburn, with a bestselling soundtrack by Rick Wakeman, which played in British cinemas for over six months and garnered wide international sales and recognition, including a 1977 BAFTA nomination for the Robert Flaherty Award (Feature Length Film, Documentary In Content).

Another Tony Maylam film which received an extensive cinema release in 1976 was Genesis in Concert, featuring Phil Collins, which, like White Rock, was shot in anamorphic Panavision.  This led to Tony Maylam's first fictional feature film, an adaption of the classic novel, The Riddle of the Sands, starring Simon MacCorkindale, Michael York and Jenny Agutter, which he wrote and directed.

Bob and Harvey Weinstein then bought White Rock and Genesis for release in the United States and released it under the combined title of Sensasia (Harvey at the time was a major rock promoter based in Buffalo, New York).  This led to the Weinstein brothers' first venture as full movie producers, the cult horror film The Burning, which Maylam directed and which was also the first film for Jason Alexander, Fisher Stevens and Holly Hunter. Whilst in the United States, Maylam also directed a movie for ABC television, The Sins of Dorian Gray, a 1983 made-for-TV adaptation of Oscar Wilde's novel The Picture of Dorian Gray that starred Anthony Perkins.

Tony Maylam also wrote and directed the sport film Hero, featuring Diego Maradona, the Official Film of the FIFA World Cup, which received wide acclaim during its international cinema release (including Argentina, where it was one of the biggest box-office successes of 1987).
											       
Back in the UK, Maylam made the critically acclaimed feature-length film for the BBC, Across the Lake, starring Anthony Hopkins, which was one of the highest-rated dramas on British television throughout the 1980s.

Besides a substantial amount of commercial work for companies like Coca-Cola, Goodyear and Shell, in 1992, Maylam directed a science fiction thriller, Split Second, starring Rutger Hauer, which was widely shown internationally, including the biggest print-release of any independent British film in the US.  In 2001, he wrote and directed the movie thriller, Phoenix Blue, and in 2008, wrote and directed a thriller shot in Italy and London, Journal of a Contract Killer, which won Best Film and Best Actress at the New York International Independent Film and Video Festival.

Tony Maylam has also written and directed ten major documentaries for Speed/Fox TV under the title, Victory by Design. This award-winning series is continuing its run.

He married in 1985 French politician Joëlle Garriaud, now a member of the French Senate.

Filmography

References 

English film directors
Living people
Horror film directors
Date of birth missing (living people)
Place of birth missing (living people)
1943 births
Alumni of RADA